is the 5th compilation album released by Rimi Natsukawa on .

Promotion

The album was preceded by the single "Ano Hana no Yō ni" by two months. The song was written by singer Masumi, and was used as the theme song of the drama Fullswing.

Contents

The album features songs chosen by Natsukawa as her favourites from her discography. All the chosen songs are songs with messages in them. Only four A-sides feature: the rest are album tracks (with the exception of "Sora no Yō ni Umi no Yō ni" and "Gettōka," which were B-sides from the "Kokoro Tsutae" and "Michishirube" singles respectively.

Track listing

Japan Sales Rankings

References
 	

Rimi Natsukawa albums
2005 compilation albums
Victor Entertainment compilation albums